Cobb Peak, at  above sea level is the 12th highest peak in the Pioneer Mountains of Idaho. The peak is located in Sawtooth National Forest and Blaine County. It is the 35th highest peak in Idaho.

References 

Mountains of Idaho
Mountains of Blaine County, Idaho
Sawtooth National Forest